DiMenna–Nyselius Library is located on the campus of Fairfield University in Fairfield, Connecticut, USA.

External links
 
 Fairfield University Digital Archive @ DiMenna-Nyselius Library
 DigitalCommons@Fairfield

University and college academic libraries in the United States
Fairfield University
Libraries in Fairfield County, Connecticut
Buildings and structures in Fairfield, Connecticut
Library buildings completed in 1968
1968 establishments in Connecticut